The Armstrong Whitworth 12-inch naval gun of 40 calibres length was designed by and manufactured mainly by Armstrong's ordnance branch, Elswick Ordnance Company. It was intended for the Royal Navy's s, but budgetary constraints delayed their introduction. The first units were instead supplied to Japan. As the Type 41 12-inch (305 mm) 40-calibre naval gun it was the standard main battery on several early United Kingdom-built pre-dreadnought battleships of the Imperial Japanese Navy.

It later entered service with the RN as the 12-inch Mark IX, being fitted to warships of three pre-dreadnought classes prior to World War I. Also, during the war several guns were converted for use as railway guns, and, towards the end of the conflict, for use on the M-class submarine monitors.

The gun also saw service with the Italian Regia Marina, in two classes of pre-dreadnought battleships.

Design and development 
The Type 41 12-inch naval gun was produced by Armstrong Whitworth, Elswick, Newcastle upon Tyne, as a slightly modified version of the "EOC G pattern" 12-inch guns used on contemporary Royal Navy battleships.

Japanese service 
Each ship carried four guns in twin turrets.

In combat at the Battle of the Yellow Sea in the Russo-Japanese War, the Japanese battleships Asahi,  and Mikasa all had one of their main guns taken out of action due to premature bore detonations. The cause was traced to faulty fuses, and the problem was rectified prior to the Battle of Tsushima.

The gun was officially designated as "Type 41" from the 41st year of the reign of Emperor Meiji on 25 December 1908. It was further re-designated in centimetres on 5 October 1917 as part of the standardization process for the Imperial Japanese Navy to the metric system.

The Type 41 12-inch gun fired an  shell, with either an armour-piercing, high-explosive or general-purpose warhead.

United Kingdom service

Royal Navy service 

The gun entered service with the Royal Navy as "BL 12 inch gun Mark IX" on the following ships :
 s: Three ships, laid down 1898 and mounting four guns each.
 s: Five ships, laid down in 1898–1901 and mounting four guns each.
 s: Six ships laid down 1899, each mounting four guns.
 s of 1904. Five of the eight ships of this class (and ) carried the Mark IX gun.

M-class submarine mounting 

The gun was in service mounted on the three M-class submarines. HMS M2 and M3 had their guns removed in 1927–28.

Railway gun 

Four guns were mounted on railway carriages and used by the British army in World War I on the Western Front.

United Kingdom ammunition

Italian service 

Armstrongs also sold versions of their 12-inch 40-calibre gun to Italy to arm the two  (commissioned 1905) and the four s (commissioned 1908). The version for the Regina Elena class fired a heavier  shell.
The Regina Margheritas were lost during the war, the Regina Elenas scrapped after the war.

See also 
 List of naval guns

Weapons of comparable role, performance and era 
 305 mm/40 Modèle 1893/1896 French equivalent
 Russian 12-inch 40-caliber naval gun Russian equivalent

Notes

References

Bibliography 
 Text Book of Gunnery, 1902. London: Printed for His Majesty's Stationery Office, by Harrison and Sons, St. Martin's Lane

Further reading

External links 

 

 

Naval guns of Japan
Russo-Japanese war weapons of Japan
Naval guns of the United Kingdom
Naval guns of Italy
305 mm artillery
Elswick Ordnance Company